Karazybash (Qaraźıbaş) is a rural locality (a village) in Starotumbagushevsky Selsoviet, Sharansky District, Bashkortostan, Russia. The population was 74 as of 2010. There are 2 streets.

Geography 
Karazybash is located 5 km northeast of Sharan (the district's administrative centre) by road. Starotumbagushevo is the nearest rural locality.

References 

Rural localities in Sharansky District